Əyin (also, Eyin) is a village in the Qubadli Rayon of Azerbaijan.

Notable natives 
    
 Suleiman Rahimov — writer, People's writer of the Azerbaijan SSR (1960).

References 

Populated places in Qubadli District